Ted Thomas (19 February 1922 – 11 August 1996) was an  Australian rules footballer who played with North Melbourne in the Victorian Football League (VFL).

Notes

External links 

1922 births
1996 deaths
Australian rules footballers from Victoria (Australia)
North Melbourne Football Club players